Gråsjøen is a lake/reservoir in the municipality of Surnadal in Møre og Romsdal county, Norway (and a very small part in the northeastern corner of the lake is in Rindal Municipality in Trøndelag county).  The lake is located in the northern part of the Trollheimen mountain range.  The lake is dammed and the water is used in the Gråsjø power station.  The water flows out of the lake and into the lake Foldsjøen.  Mount Snota lies just south of the lake.

See also
List of lakes in Norway

References

Rindal
Surnadal
Lakes of Trøndelag
Lakes of Møre og Romsdal
Reservoirs in Norway